Primera División Reserves (El Salvador) (officially known as Torneo Reservas), is the reserve team league for the top El Salvador football teams in the Primera Divisió. The league is split into a Clausura and Apertura season.

The league in its current form started in 2009, restarting the top level of reserve-team football which had been inactive since 2003.

Teams are not relegated from the Torneo Reservas League based on their final league position, but on the league position of their respective clubs' senior teams. If a senior team is relegated from the Premier League, then the reserve team is relegated from the Premier Reserve League and replaced by the reserve team of the promoted team.

Champions
The list of all finals

Performance by Reserves club

Teams & Coaches (2020 Apertura)
 Águila reserve side is coached by Santos Noel Riviera.
 Alianza reserve side is coached by Edgar Henriquez
 Atletico Marte reserve side is coached by TBD.
 Chalatenango reserve side is coached by Geovanni Portillo.
 FAS reserve side is coached by  Enzo Henriquez.
 Firpo reserve side is coached by Miguel Ovando (*).
 Jocoro reserve side is coached by Oscar Eduardo Alvarez.
 Limeno reserve side is coached by Manuel Carranza Murillo.
 Metapán reserve side is coached by Hector Omar Mejia.
 Once Deportivo reserve side is coached by Ivan Ruiz (*).
 Santa Tecla reserve side is coached by Eduardo Castillo.
 Sonsonate reserve side is coached by Alonzo Aguilar (*).

Top scorers

External links
  (culebrita macheteada)

Reserves
2009 establishments in El Salvador
El Salvador
Sports leagues established in 2009
Res